The Dead Mother is a 1993 Spanish drama film directed by Juanma Bajo Ulloa which stars Karra Elejalde and Ana Álvarez alongside Lio and Silvia Marsó. Together with Bajo Ulloa's debut feature Butterfly Wings (1991), it contributed to the creation of an aura of cult auteur around the director.

Plot 
A girl, Leire, ends up as mentally impaired after being shot in the head in a domestic rob attempt by Ismael, who also kills Leire's mother (a restorer of religious images). The plot primarily concerns the ambiguous relationship between Ismael and Leire, after Ismael kidnaps Leire years later.

Cast

Production 
The film is a Gasteizko Zinema production. It was primarily shot in Vitoria-Gasteiz.

Release 
The film was presented at the 50th Venice International Film Festival's 'Venetian Nights' section in September 1993, later screening at the Montreal Film Festival. It was theatrically released in Spain on 5 November 1993.

Reception 
Ángel Fernández-Santos of El País deemed the film to have a lower quality than it appears to display at first glance, writing that "it holds up as an exercise in the mechanics of violence by a very skilled director, but it lacks a system for embodying that violence in believable human beings", dragged by bad writing and poor dialogues.

Accolades 

|-
| align = "center" | 1993 || Montreal Film Festival || Best Director || Juanma Bajo Ulloa ||  || align = "center" | 
|-
| align = "center" rowspan = "4" | 1994 || rowspan = "4" | 8th Goya Awards || Best Director || Juanma Bajo Ulloa ||  || rowspan = "4" | 
|-
| Best Cinematography || Javier Aguirresarobe ||  
|-
| Best Editing || Pablo Blanco || 
|-
| Best Special Effects || Hipólito Cantero ||  
|}

See also 
 List of Spanish films of 1993

References 

Films shot in the Basque Country (autonomous community)
1990s Spanish-language films
1993 drama films
Spanish drama films
Films about kidnapping
1990s Spanish films